In physiology, dehydration is a lack of total body water, with an accompanying disruption of metabolic processes. It occurs when free water loss exceeds free water intake, usually due to exercise, disease, or high environmental temperature. Mild dehydration can also be caused by immersion diuresis, which may increase risk of decompression sickness in divers.

Most people can tolerate a 3-4% decrease in total body water without difficulty or adverse health effects. A 5-8% decrease can cause fatigue and dizziness. Loss of over 10% of total body water can cause physical and mental deterioration, accompanied by severe thirst. Death occurs at a loss of between 15-25% of the body water. Mild dehydration is characterized by thirst and general discomfort and is usually resolved with oral rehydration.

Dehydration can cause hypernatremia (high levels of sodium ions in the blood) and is distinct from hypovolemia (loss of blood volume, particularly blood plasma).

Signs and symptoms 

The hallmarks of dehydration include thirst and neurological changes such as headaches, general discomfort, loss of appetite, nausea, decreased urine volume (unless polyuria is the cause of dehydration), confusion, unexplained tiredness, purple fingernails, and seizures. The symptoms of dehydration become increasingly severe with greater total body water loss. A body water loss of 1-2%, considered mild dehydration, is shown to impair cognitive performance. While in people over age 50, the body's thirst sensation diminishes with age, a study found that there was no difference in fluid intake between young and old people. Many older people have symptoms of dehydration. Dehydration contributes to morbidity in the elderly population, especially during conditions that promote insensible free water losses, such as hot weather. A Cochrane review on this subject defined water-loss dehydration as "people with serum osmolality of 295 mOsm/kg or more" and found that the main symptom in the elderly (people aged over 65) was fatigue.

Cause
Risk factors for dehydration include but are not limited to: exerting oneself in hot and humid weather, habitation at high altitudes, endurance athletics, elderly adults, infants, children and people living with chronic illnesses.

Dehydration can also come as a side effect from many different types of drugs and medications.

In the elderly, blunted response to thirst or inadequate ability to access free water in the face of excess free water losses (especially hyperglycemia related) seem to be the main causes of dehydration. Excess free water or hypotonic water can leave the body in two ways – sensible loss such as osmotic diuresis, sweating, vomiting and diarrhea, and insensible water loss, occurring mainly through the skin and respiratory tract. In humans, dehydration can be caused by a wide range of diseases and states that impair water homeostasis in the body. These occur primarily through either impaired thirst/water access or sodium excess.

Diagnosis

Definition 
Dehydration occurs when water intake does not replace free water lost due to normal physiologic processes, including breathing, urination, perspiration, or other causes, including diarrhea, and vomiting. Dehydration can be life-threatening when severe and lead to seizures or respiratory arrest, and also carries the risk of osmotic cerebral edema if rehydration is overly rapid.

The term "dehydration" has sometimes been used incorrectly as a proxy for the separate, related condition of hypovolemia, which specifically refers to a decrease in volume of blood plasma. The two are regulated through independent mechanisms in humans; the distinction is important in guiding treatment.

Prevention 
For routine activities, thirst is normally an adequate guide to maintain proper hydration. Minimum water intake will vary individually depending on weight, energy expenditure, age, sex, physical activity, environment, diet, and genetics.  With exercise, exposure to hot environments, or a decreased thirst response, additional water may be required. In athletes in competition, drinking to thirst optimizes performance and safety, despite weight loss, and as of 2010, there was no scientific study showing that it is beneficial to stay ahead of thirst and maintain weight during exercise.

In warm or humid weather, or during heavy exertion, water loss can increase markedly, because humans have a large and widely variable capacity for sweating. Whole-body sweat losses in men can exceed 2 L/h during competitive sport, with rates of 3–4 L/h observed during short-duration, high-intensity exercise in the heat. When such large amounts of water are being lost through perspiration, electrolytes, especially sodium, are also being lost.

In most athletes exercising and sweating for 4–5 hours with a sweat sodium concentration of less than 50 mmol/L, the total sodium lost is less than 10% of total body stores (total stores are approximately 2,500 mmol, or 58 g for a 70-kg person). These losses appear to be well tolerated by most people. The inclusion of sodium in fluid replacement drinks has some theoretical benefits and poses little or no risk, so long as these fluids are hypotonic (since the mainstay of dehydration prevention is the replacement of free water losses).

Treatment 

The most effective treatment for minor dehydration is widely considered to be drinking water and reducing fluid loss. Plain water restores only the volume of the blood plasma, inhibiting the thirst mechanism before solute levels can be replenished. Solid foods can contribute to fluid loss from vomiting and diarrhea. Urine concentration and frequency will return to normal as dehydration resolves.

In some cases, correction of a dehydrated state is accomplished by the replenishment of necessary water and electrolytes (through oral rehydration therapy, or fluid replacement by intravenous therapy). As oral rehydration is less painful, non-invasive, inexpensive, and easier to provide, it is the treatment of choice for mild dehydration. Solutions used for intravenous rehydration must be isotonic or hypertonic. Pure water injected into the veins will cause the breakdown (lysis) of red blood cells (erythrocytes).

When fresh water is unavailable (e.g. at sea or in a desert), seawater or drinks with significant alcohol concentration will worsen dehydration. Urine contains a lower solute concentration than seawater; this requires the kidneys to create more urine to remove the excess salt, causing more water to be lost than was consumed from seawater. If a person is dehydrated and taken to a medical facility, IVs can also be used.

For severe cases of dehydration where fainting, unconsciousness, or other severely inhibiting symptoms are present (the patient is incapable of standing or thinking clearly), emergency attention is required. Fluids containing a proper balance of replacement electrolytes are given orally or intravenously with continuing assessment of electrolyte status; complete resolution is normal in all but the most extreme cases.

See also 
 Hydrational fluids
 Terminal dehydration
 Dryness (medical)
 Hypernatremia

References

Further reading

External links 

 Definition of dehydration by the U.S. National Institutes of Health's MedlinePlus medical encyclopedia

 
Causes of death
Nutrition
Symptoms and signs
Wilderness medical emergencies